Kristiina Ross (born on 3 June 1955 in Tallinn) is an Estonian linguist and translator.  

In 1978 she graduated from Tartu State University in Estonian philology. Since 1978 she is working at Estonian Language Institute. She has also worked at Estonian Humanitarian Institute.

Her main fields of research have been the grammar of Estonian language and other Finnic languages, Bible translations into Estonian.

Her father was the writer Jaan Kross.

Awards
 2003: Order of the White Star, IV class
 2007: Wiedemann Language Award

Works 
 Heebrea keel algajatele (1985)
 lnstruktiiv läänemeresoome keeltes (1988)
 Eesti keele käsiraamat (1997, 2007, with M. Erelt and T. Erelt)
 Esimene Moosese raamat. Iiobi raamat (2003, compilator) 
 Common roots of the Latvian and Estonian literary languages (2008, one of the authors) 
 Linguistic Ideas of the Lutheran Reformation in the Genesis of Literary Estonian. In: Kauko, Mikko; Norro, Miika; Nummila, Kirsi-Maria; Toropainen, Tanja; Fonsén Tuomo (Ed.). Languages in the Lutheran Reformation. Textual Networks and the Spread of Ideas. Amsterdam University Press, p. 57-77. (Crossing Boundaries: Turku Medieval and Early Modern Studies)
 Ross, Kristiina; Lohk, Ahti (2017). Words, Forms and Phrases in Estonian Folksongs and Hymns. Folklore: Electronic Journal of Folklore, 67, 49−64.10.7592/FEJF.
 Die Entstehung der estnischen Schriftsprache im Kontext der deutschen und estnischen Kulturgeschichte. Jahrbuch des Vereins für niederdeutsche Sprachforschung. Kiel/Hamburg: Wachholtz Verlag – Murmann Publishers, 2016, S. 57-68. (Niededeutsches Jahrbuch).
 Spuren einer mittelalterlichen estnischen Gemeinschaftssprache in frühprotestantischen Schriftzeugnissen. Kadri-Rutt Hahn, Matthias Thumser, Eberhard Winkler. Estnisches Mittelalter. Sprache – Gesellschaft – Kirche. Münster: LIT Verlag, 2015, S. 41-53. (Schriften der Baltischen Historischen Kommission; 20).
 Ross, Kristiina; Vanags, Pēteris (eds.). Common Roots of the Latvian and Estonian Literary Languages. Peter Lang Europäischer Verlag der Wissenschaften, 2008 .

References

Living people
1955 births
Linguists from Estonia
Estonian translators
Estonian Finno-Ugrists
Recipients of the  Order of the White Star, 4th Class
University of Tartu alumni
People from Tallinn